Bosnian genocide denial is the act of denying that the systematic Bosnian genocide against the Bosniak Muslim population of Bosnia and Herzegovina occurred, or asserting that it did not occur in the manner or to the extent that has been established by the International Criminal Tribunal for the former Yugoslavia (ICTY) and the International Court of Justice (ICJ) through its proceedings and judgments, and described by comprehensive scholarship.

In its judgment, the ICJ adopted the ICTY's conclusion from Radislav Krstić's conviction and concluded that what happened in and around Srebrenica was done by members of the Army of Republika Srpska (VRS) "with the specific intent to destroy in part the group of the Muslims of Bosnia and Herzegovina as such", which constitute acts of genocide committed". These two aforementioned courts have ruled differently only concerning direct responsibility for perpetrating acts of genocide in Bosnia and Herzegovina. The ICJ, in a proceeding Bosnian genocide case, brought by Bosnia and Herzegovina against Serbia and Montenegro, has made rulings to the extent in which Serbia was not directly responsible for the perpetration of the crime of genocide, but was responsible under "customary international law" violating the obligation to "prevent and punish the crime of genocide". Other international bodies, such as the European Court of Human Rights and the United Nations General Assembly, have also passed resolutions acknowledging that genocide occurred in Bosnia. German courts have reached convictions based upon a much more expansive interpretation of genocide than that used by international courts.

The origins of denial lie within groups of Serbian and international scholars, supported in part by Serb and international political and media bodies. After the war, Serb culture generated a stance that Serbs were the aggrieved side and that certain historical events had curtailed national goals. Sonja Biserko has drawn parallels with other examples of negationist historical revisionism and denialism, such as Armenian, and Rwandan genocide denial.

Serb policies during the Yugoslav Wars and their foremost protagonists have been whitewashed and justified by some "anti-war" and "anti-imperialist" public intellectuals and authors abroad, mostly on the "left" side of the ideological spectrum, but also "liberatarian" right-wingers, and this has sometimes morphed into outright denial.

Background

The Bosnian genocide refers sometimes to the genocide in Srebrenica, perpetrated by Bosnian Serb forces in summer of 1995, or refers to the broader crimes against humanity, and ethnic cleansing campaign throughout areas controlled by the Army of Republika Srpska (VRS) during the 1992–1995 Bosnian War. 
Genocide scholars widely acknowledge it as the biggest war crime perpetrated on European soil since World War II.

The events in Srebrenica in 1995 included the killing of more than 8,000 Bosniak (Bosnian Muslim) men and boys, as well as the mass expulsion of another 25,000–30,000 Bosniak civilians, in and around the town of Srebrenica in Bosnia and Herzegovina, committed by units of the VRS under the command of General Ratko Mladić.

The ethnic cleansing campaign took place throughout the areas controlled by the Bosnian Serb forces, and targeted Bosniaks and Bosnian Croats. This campaign included extermination, unlawful confinement, mass rape, sexual assault, torture, plunder and destruction of private and public property, inhumane treatment of civilians; the targeting of political leaders, intellectuals, and professionals; the unlawful deportation and transfer of civilians; it also included the unlawful shelling of civilians, the unlawful appropriation and plunder of real and personal property, the destruction of homes and businesses, and systemic destruction of places of worship.

ICTY was tasked by the United Nations to prosecute the war crimes that had been committed during the Yugoslav Wars, including the Bosnian War. The ICJ decided on the Bosnian genocide case, a public international law case brought by Bosnia and Herzegovina against Serbia and Montenegro. The ICJ, in a proceeding Bosnia and Herzegovina vs. Serbia and Montenegro, adopted the ICTY's conclusion from Radislav Krstić's conviction and concluded that what happened in and around Srebrenica from 13 July 1995 was done by the Army of Republika Srpska (VRS) "with the specific intent to destroy in part the group of the Muslims of Bosnia and Herzegovina as such, which constitute acts of genocide committed". But the ICJ ruled that, although Serbia and Montenegro had provided significant assistance to Republika Srpska, it was not established that it was responsible for the perpetration of the crime of genocide nor had it violated its obligations to "prevent and punish the crime of genocide". The court confirmed that genocide took place at Srebrenica in July 1995. The court also decided that Serbia had not planned, or encouraged this genocide, but that it was guilty of not doing everything in its power to prevent it. 

Besides ICTY and ICJ, other international bodies, such as the European Court of Human Rights and the United Nations General Assembly, have also passed resolutions acknowledging that genocide occurred in Bosnia. Similarly, the 2005 resolutions of the United States Congress and Senate, declared that "the Serbian policies of aggression and ethnic cleansing meet the terms defining genocide". Also, three convictions for genocide have been reached in courts in Germany.

Culture and politics of denial

Definition and origins 
Bosnian genocide denial is an act of denying that the genocide against the Muslim Bosniak population of Bosnia and Herzegovina occurred, or asserting that it did not occur in the manner or to the extent that has been established by the International Criminal Tribunal for the former Yugoslavia (ICTY) and the International Court of Justice (ICJ) through its proceedings and judgments, and described by subsequent comprehensive scholarship. 

The origins of denial lie with a group of Serbian nationalists, supported by part of the Serb political and media establishment. The post war situation generated a stance within Serb culture that Serbs were the aggrieved side and that certain historical events had curtailed national goals. Sonja Biserko, president of the Helsinki Committee for Human Rights in Serbia at the time, drew parallels with other examples of negationist historical revisionism and denialism, such as Armenian and Rwandan genocide denial. According to Biserko, the methods range from the "brutal to the deceitful". She noted that denial in Serbia, is present "most strongly in political discourse, in the media, in the sphere of law, and in the educational system". Biserko and the University of Sarajevo's criminology professor Edina Bećirević have pointed to a "culture of denial" in Serbian society, stating that: "Denial of the Srebrenica genocide takes many forms in Serbia".

Tactics and methods 

During the Bosnian war, Slobodan Milošević had effective control of most Serbian media. Following the end of the war, denialism continued to be widespread among Serbians.
Revisionism ranges from challenging the judicial recognition of the killings as an act of genocide to the denial of a massacre having taken place, and uses a variety of methods. The finding of genocide by the ICJ and the ICTY has been disputed on evidential and theoretical grounds. The number of the dead has been questioned, as has the nature of their deaths. It has been alleged that considerably fewer than 8,000 were killed and/or that most of those killed died in battle rather than by execution. It has been claimed that the interpretation of "genocide" is refuted by the survival of the women and children.

Attempted cover-up by means of reburials 

From approximately 1 August 1995 to 1 November 1995, there was an organized effort, on behalf of the military and political leadership of Republika Srpska, to remove bodies from primary mass gravesites and transport them to secondary and tertiary ones. The reburial was done crudely, using heavy mechanized vehicles such as trenchers and baggers. In the International Criminal Tribunal for the former Yugoslavia court case "Prosecutor v. Blagojević and Jokić", the trial chamber found that this reburial effort was an attempt to conceal evidence of the mass murders. The trial chamber found that the cover up operation was ordered by the Bosnian Serb Army (BSA) Main Staff and subsequently carried out by members of the Bratunac and Zvornik Brigades.

The crude manner of the cover-up operation had a direct impact on the recovery and identification of remains. The removal and reburial of the bodies caused them to become dismembered with parts of different individuals interspersed, making it difficult for forensic investigators to positively identify the remains. In one specific case, one person's remains were found in two different locations, 30 km apart.
In addition to the ligatures and blindfolds found at the mass graves, the effort to hide the bodies has been seen as evidence of the organised nature of the massacres and the non-combatant status of the victims, since if the victims had died in normal combat operations, there would be no need to hide their remains.

Official Republika Srpska reports

First Republika Srpska report (2002) 

In September 2002, the Republika Srpska government commissioned the "Report about Case Srebrenica. The document, authored by Darko Trifunović, was endorsed by many leading Bosnian Serb politicians. It purported that 1,800 Bosnian Muslim soldiers died during fighting and a further 100 more died as a result of exhaustion. "The number of Muslim soldiers killed by Bosnian Serbs out of personal revenge or lack of knowledge of international law is probably about 100...It is important to uncover the names of the perpetrators in order to accurately and unequivocally establish whether or not these were isolated instances". The report also makes allegations regarding the examinations of the mass graves, purporting that they were made for hygiene reasons, question the legitimacy of the missing person lists and undermine a key witness' mental health and military history. The International Crisis Group and the United Nations condemned the manipulation of their statements in this report, and Humanitarian Law Center thoroughly deconstructed all the reports published by all Republika Srpska commissions, starting with this one whose methods and manipulations were described in their report from February 2019. The International Criminal Tribunal for the former Yugoslavia described the report as "one of the worst examples of revisionism in relation to the mass executions of Bosnian Muslims committed in Srebrenica in July 1995". Outrage and condemnation by a wide variety of Balkan and international figures eventually forced the Republika Srpska to disown the report.

Second Republika Srpska report and apology (2004) 

On 7 March 2003, the Human Rights Chamber for Bosnia and Herzegovina issued a decision which ordered the Republika Srpska, among other things, to conduct a full investigation into the Srebrenica July 1995 events, and disclose the results at the latest on 7 September 2003. The Chamber had no coercive power to implement the decision, especially because it ceased to exist in late 2003. The Republika Srpska then published two reports, on 3 June 2003 and 5 September 2003, which the Human Rights Chamber concluded did not fulfill the obligations of the Republika Srpska. On 15 October 2003, The High Representative, Paddy Ashdown, lamented that "getting the truth from the [Bosnian Serb] government is like extracting rotten teeth".
The Srebrenica commission, officially titled the Commission for Investigation of the Events in and around Srebrenica between 10 and 19 July 1995, was established in December 2003, and submitted its final report on 4 June 2004, and then an addendum on 15 October 2004 after delayed information was supplied. The report acknowledged that at least 7,000 men and boys were killed by Bosnian Serb forces, citing a provisional figure of 7,800.
In the report, because of "limited time" and to "maximize resources", the commission "accepted the historical background and the facts stated in the second-instance judgment 'Prosecutor vs. Radislav Krstić', when the ICTY convicted the accused for 'assisting and supporting genocide' committed in Srebrenica".

The findings of the commission remains generally disputed by Serb nationalists, who claim that commission was heavily pressured by the High Representative, given that an earlier RS government report which exonerated the Serbs was dismissed.
Nevertheless, Dragan Čavić, the president of Republika Srpska at the time, acknowledged in a televised address that Serb forces killed several thousand civilians in violation of the international law, and asserted that Srebrenica was a dark chapter in Serb history, and on 10 November 2004, the government of Republika Srpska finally issued an official apology.

Second Republika Srpska report revision (2010) 

On 21 April 2010, the government of Republika Srpska under Milorad Dodik, at the time the prime minister, initiated a revision of the 2004 report saying that the numbers of killed were exaggerated and the report was manipulated by a former peace envoy. The Office of the High Representative responded by saying: "The Republika Srpska government should reconsider its conclusions and align itself with the facts and legal requirements and act accordingly, rather than inflicting emotional distress on the survivors, torture history and denigrate the public image of the country".

On 12 July 2010, at the 15th anniversary of the massacre, Milorad Dodik said that he acknowledged the killings that happened on the site, but denied that what happened at Srebrenica was genocide.  In 2021 Dodik continued to claim that there had been no genocide and asserted on Bosnian Serb TV that coffins in the memorial cemetery were empty, with only names.

Republika Srpska rejection of 2004 report and new commission (2018-19) 
On 14. August 2018 the People's Assembly of Republika Srpska dismissed the 2004 report and decided for a new commission to be assembled to revise report surrounding events in Srebrenica and area around the town in July 1995. Initiated by Milorad Dodik, then the entity president, and his Alliance of Independent Social Democrats party (SNSD), the move was immediately criticized by the international community. Humanitarian Law Center, in their report signed by 31 high-profile signatories, described this new development as "the culmination of more than a decade of genocide denial and historical revisionism by the SNSD government in the Republika Srpska", adding that the HLC regard this newest initiative to be "illegitimate overall", and that it "represents a flawed response to a legitimate need". The United States State Department issued a communiqué in which they criticized move by Republika Srpska entity officials and institutions, describing it as "(a)ttempts to reject or amend the report on Srebrenica are part of wider efforts to revise the facts of the past war, to deny history, and to politicize tragedy".

Revisionism and denialism abroad
Serb 1990s policies in the Yugoslav Wars and its foremost protagonists have been whitewashed and justified by some "anti-war" and "anti-imperialist" public intellectuals and authors abroad, mostly on the "left" side of the ideological spectrum, but also "liberatarian" right-wing, while Serbian late president Milošević is still admired in various circles.
This apologia often morphs into attempts to whitewash war crimes perpetrated by Serbian security, military and paramilitary forces, or denial of the nature and extent of these crimes, using a variety of revisionist and denialist narratives concerning the break-up of Yugoslavia. These often make accusations of a Western conspiracy against Yugoslavia and the Serbs, which culminated with the NATO interventions against Serbia and the Republika Srpska.

"Left" revisionists
Revisionists mainly identifying with the "far-left" of the ideological and political spectrum, such as Michael Parenti, Economist Edward S. Herman, David Peterson, Jared Israel, Tariq Ali, the British journalist Mick Hume, Diana Johnstone, and John Robles of Voice of Russia engaged in revisionism and denial of the Bosnian genocide and its various aspects, while blaming the West, the NATO, Croats, Bosniaks, and Albanians for the Serbians and their forces' actions, absolving the latter of any responsibility of the atrocities committed.

Herman and Hume alleged a discrepancy of over 8,000 victims between the official number of victims and the number of bodies they "found" and doubted the explanation of the events, while ignoring delays in the locating of mass graves and identification of bodies by DNA analysis. Herman and Peterson engaged in revisionism and denial, in several articles, such as "The Politics of the Srebrenica Massacre", written by Herman, or "The Srebrenica Massacre was a Gigantic Political Fraud", by Herman and Robles, while repeating claims about political motives by western governments and NATO conspirators from Herman and Peterson book Politics of Genocide, authors, concentrating on the Srebrenica massacre, state that Serbs at Srebrenica were actually "killing Bosnian-Muslim soldiers" and, even, that happened in response to the "killing of over 2,000 Serb civilians, mostly women and children, at the location by Bosnian-Muslim army", and that the numbers of executed Bosnian-Muslim soldiers "were probably in the order of between 500 and 1,000 (...) (i)n other words, less than half of the number of Serb civilians killed before July, 1995". For these claims they rely on information provided by another writer, Diana Johnstone, who had never set foot in Bosnia. In Politics of Genocide, Herman and Peterson claim that the Serbs only killed men of military age at Srebrenica.

This view is not supported by the findings of the ICJ or the ICTY. What Johnstone, Herman, Peterson, Robles and others omit, but ICTY findings clearly describes, especially in trial judgments of Naser Orić and Radislav Krstić, is that villages surrounding Srebrenica, where alleged killings of Serb women and children, according to this group of revisionists, took place, were in most cases actually Bosnian Muslim villages from where their original inhabitants (Bosnian Muslims) escaped or were driven out by the Bosnian Serb military offensive with subsequent occupation and establishment of the frontlines, and where Bosnian Serb civilians rarely entered. Meanwhile, villages surrounding Srebrenica, which in fact belonged to Serb population, were heavily fortified and militarized, with villages like Kravica being used to store caches of weapons and ammunition, and from which Serbs launched attacks on Bosnian Muslim villages, as well as on the town of Srebrenica itself.

Living Marxism
Living Marxism was a British magazine launched in 1988 as the journal of the British Revolutionary Communist Party (RCP). It was later rebranded as LM but ceased publication in March 2000 after it lost a libel lawsuit brought by ITN, a British television company.

Living Marxism claims

In the first issue as LM, editor Mick Hume published an article by journalist Thomas Deichmann, which claimed that ITN had deliberately misrepresented the Bosnian war in its 1992 coverage, specifically coverage of Serb-run concentration camps at Omarska, Keraterm and Trnopolje.

The article "The picture that fooled the world" argued that the report by UK journalists Ed Vulliamy, Penny Marshall and Ian Williams, was faked. These ITN reports had followed initial reports on camps (from Bratunac to Prijedor) by Maggie O'Kane and Roy Gutman, which had revealed Serb-run prison camps in Bosanska Krajina in north-western Bosnia. In August 1992 Vulliamy and O'Kane had gained access to the Omarska and Trnopolje camps. Their accounts of the conditions of the prisoners were recorded for the documentary Omarska's survivors: Bosnia 1992. Discovery of the camps was credited with contributing to the establishment of the International Criminal Tribunal for the former Yugoslavia (ICTY) in The Hague.

Deichmann claimed in his article, published by LM in February 1997, that the ITN footage, created in front of Trnopolje concentration camp, featuring a group of emaciated Bosnian Muslim men prisoners, including Fikret Alić, standing behind a barbed wire fence, was deliberately staged to portray a Nazi-style extermination camp. The article further claimed that the ITN reporters, Penny Marshall and Ian Williams, had actually stood inside a compound surrounded by a barbed wire fence and from there filmed their report. The article alleged that the camp: "was not a prison, and certainly not a 'concentration camp', but a collection centre for refugees, many of whom went there seeking safety and could leave again if they wished".

ITN vs. LM trial
In 1998, the publishers of LM, Informinc (LM) Ltd., were sued for libel by ITN. The case initially caused widespread condemnation of ITN. Among those who supported LM was journalist John Simpson, who in April 2012 publicly apologized for questioning ITN's reporting on the camps and for supporting the magazine.

The journalist George Monbiot, wrote in Prospect magazine that, what he described as "some of the world's leading liberals", including Harold Evans, Doris Lessing, Paul Theroux, Fay Weldon had jumped to the magazine's defense, while others had condemned ITN's "deplorable attack on press freedom". He added: "The Institute of Contemporary Arts, bulwark of progressive liberalism, enhanced LMs heroic profile by co-hosting a three-day conference with the magazine, called "Free Speech Wars". With the blessing of the liberal world, this puny iconoclastic David will go to war with the clanking orthodoxies of the multinational Goliath". Monbiot further argued that LM wished its struggle to be seen as a struggle for liberal values, but that this cause was less liberal than LMs supporters wanted to believe. Monbiot concluded that LM had less in common with the left than with the fanatical right.

The libel case was decided against LM and in March 2000 the magazine was forced to close. Reporters Penny Marshall and Ian Williams were each awarded £150,000 over the LM story and the magazine was ordered to pay £75,000 for libeling ITN in a February 1997 article. In an interview with The Times, on question "would (he) do it again", Hume commented that they could have got out of the case by apologising but that he believes in "freedom to state what you understand to be true, even if it causes offence", and that he would do anything to avoid similar proceedings in court ever again, but that "some things really are more important than a mortgage".

David Campbell summarised his study of the case as follows:

Russian Federation
On 8 July 2015, Russia vetoed a UK-drafted resolution at the Security Council which would have declared that the Srebrenica massacre was genocide on the 20th anniversary of the said crime. Russian ambassador Vitaly Churkin claimed the resolution was "not constructive, confrontational and politically motivated". Russia was the only country at the Council that objected to the resolution.

Denial by officials

Local officials

High-ranking Serbian officials have claimed that no genocide of Bosniak Muslims took place at all: 
 Milorad Dodik and his Alliance of Independent Social Democrats party (SNSD) twice attempted to revise the 2004 Srebrenica report, firstly in 2010 and later in 2018–19. These attempts were criticised by the Humanitarian Law Center who described them as "the culmination of more than a decade of genocide denial and historical revisionism" by the party's government in the Republika Srpska. While president of Republika Srpska, Dodik described the Srebrenica massacre as a "fabricated myth". He stated in an interview with the Belgrade newspaper Večernje Novosti in April 2010 that "we cannot and will never accept qualifying that event as a genocide". Dodik disowned the 2004 Republika Srpska report which had acknowledged the scale of the killing and had apologised to the relatives of the victims, claiming that the report had been adopted because of pressure from the international community. Without substantiating the figure, he claimed that the number of victims was 3,500 rather than the 7,000 accepted by the report, alleging that 500 listed victims were alive and that over 250 people buried in the Potocari memorial centre had died elsewhere. In July 2010, on the 15th anniversary of the massacre, Dodik declared that he did not regard the killings at Srebrenica as genocide, and maintained that "If a genocide happened then it was committed against Serb people of this region where women, children and the elderly were killed en masse" (referring to eastern Bosnia). In December 2010, Dodik condemned the Peace Implementation Council, an international community of 55 countries, for referring to the Srebrenica massacre as genocide. In 2017, Dodik introduced legislation that would ban the teaching of the Srebrenica genocide and Sarajevo siege in Republika Srpska's schools, stating that it was "impossible to use here the textbooks … which say the Serbs have committed genocide and kept Sarajevo under siege. This is not correct and this will not be taught here".
 Tomislav Nikolić, then-President of Serbia, stated on 2 June 2012 that "there was no genocide in Srebrenica. In Srebrenica, grave war crimes were committed by some Serbs who should be found, prosecuted and punished. [...] It is very difficult to indict someone and prove before the court that an event qualifies as genocide".
 Vojislav Šešelj 
 Ivica Dačić
 Aleksandar Vulin
 Miloš Milovanović, a former commander of the Serb paramilitary unit Serbian Guard who represents the Serbian Democratic Party in the Srebrenica Municipal Assembly, said in March 2005 that "the massacre is a lie; it is propaganda to paint a bad picture of the Serbian people. The Muslims are lying; they are manipulating the numbers; they are exaggerating what happened. Far more Serbs died at Srebrenica than Muslims".
Ana Brnabić - current prime minister of Serbia. On 14 November 2018, Brnabić in an interview with Deutsche Welle denied the massacres of Bosniaks by Bosnian Serb forces in Srebrenica as being an act of genocide.

Former UN officials and military figures
 Phillip Corwin, former UN Civilian Affairs Coordinator in Bosnia, denied a genocide. He was engaged as an advisor and contributor to the work of the Srebrenica Research Group said in 2003 that "what happened in Srebrenica was not a single large massacre of Muslims by Serbs, but rather a series of very bloody attacks and counterattacks over a three-year period" and that the likely number "of dead Muslims may not be higher than the number of Serbs killed in the Srebrenica area".
 Lewis MacKenzie, former commander of the United Nations Protection Force (UNPROFOR) in Bosnia, in an article titled "The real story behind Srebrenica" questioned the designation of genocide in 2009 firstly on the grounds that the number of men and boys killed had been exaggerated by a factor of 4, saying that 2000 victims had died in battle. while 5000 were considered missing. Secondly on the grounds that the transfer of the women and children by bus contradicted the notion of genocide – claiming that the women would have been killed first if there had been an intent to destroy the group.
 Portuguese retired general Carlos Martins Branco denies genocide ever happened in his publication "Was Srebrenica a Hoax? Eyewitness Account of a Former UN Military Observer in Bosnia" in 1998, and his memoirs "A Guerra nos Balcãs, jihadismo, geopolítica e desinformação" (War in the Balkans, Jihadism, Geopolitics, and Disinformation) in November 2016. He claims "Srebrenica was portrayed – and continues to be – as a premeditated massacre of innocent Muslim civilians. As a genocide! But was it really so?".

Other individuals and groups engaging in denial

Noam Chomsky drew criticism for not calling the Srebrenica massacre during the Bosnian War a "genocide", which he said would "devalue" the word, and in appearing to deny Ed Vulliamy's reporting on the existence of Bosnian concentration camps. The subsequent editorial correction of his comments, viewed as a capitulation, was criticized by multiple Balkan watchers, including Marko Hoare who extended his elaboration on Chomsky's position in his essay "Chomsky’s Genocidal Denial" from 17 December 2005.
 Peter Handke, Austrian writer who received the Nobel Prize in Literature in 2019, and who offered to testify on behalf of late Slobodan Milošević at ICTY trials, denied Serb-run concentration camps, Srebrenica massacre, reiterated myths that the Bosnian Muslims staged their own massacres in Sarajevo, and compared Serbia's situation during 1990's to the faith of European Jewry during the Holocaust. He offered his opinions in his numerous writings, plays and books dealing with the subject, such as A Journey to the Rivers: Justice for Serbia. Handke lauded Milošević and held eulogy for him at the funeral of the Serbian president. In the opinion of British journalist Ed Vulliamy: "(Handke) went out of his way to give credence to mass murder and, in this context, as importantly, to lies". Handke reacted to these numerous critiques by threatening to withdraw his latest play about the Bosnian war, The Journey To The Dug-Out, Or The Play About The War Film, from Vienna's Burgtheater, unless media and peer criticism stop.
 Srđa Trifković, in discussing the Scorpions, who were paramilitary units of the Serbian Ministry of Internal Affairs's  at the time and who filmed themselves executing six Bosniak teenagers in woods surrounding Srebrenica, called the video a "manipulation", insisting it was produced to retroactively justify Western policies and actions in Bosnia. Their aim, he said, was to "inflict a collective responsibility upon the Serbian people", "revise" the Dayton Agreement, and "abolish" the Serb entity in Bosnia. His other claims range from denial of evidence of genocide, and denial of the number of people killed in Srebrenica, to denial that the Skorpions were under the control of Serbian officials and institutions.
Darko Trifunović, who teaches at the Faculty of Security in Novi Sad and helped write a Srebrenica report, insisted that fewer than one hundred were actually executed at Srebrenica, and denied the validity of the genocide verdict passed by the ICJ in the case against Serbia, as well as the genocide verdict handed down by the ICTY in the case against general Radislav Krstić. He has alleged there was "Islamic radicalism" and "terrorism" in Bosnia-Herzegovina, which he has used to justify denying the validity of court verdicts.
 La Nation, a bi-monthly Swiss newspaper, published a series of articles claiming that 2,000 soldiers were killed in the "pseudo-massacre" in Srebrenica. The Society for Threatened Peoples and Swiss Association Against Impunity filed a joint suit against La Nation for genocide denial, which is prohibited by Swiss law.
 The Srebrenica Research Group, which was formerly led by Edward S. Herman, and included two former UN officials, published Srebrenica And the Politics of War Crimes (2005), which claimed that the "contention that as many as 8,000 Muslims were killed has no basis in available evidence and is essentially a political construct".
 Genocide scholar William Schabas in his 2009 book Genocide in International Law: The Crime of Crimes summarizes the legal opinions regarding the status of the atrocities committed in Srebrenica and throughout the Bosnian war, deeming them ethnic cleansing and not genocide, stating that "Ethnic cleansing is also a warning sign of genocide to come. Genocide is the last resort of the frustrated ethnic cleanser".
Efraim Zuroff, director of the Simon Wiesenthal Center office in Israel argued that "genocide is an attempt to completely erase one nation", so "there was no genocide in BiH" (Bosnia) and reportedly said that Srebrenica could not have been genocide because the Serbs had spared the women and children at Srebrenica. Zuroff welcomed the life sentence given to Ratko Mladić by the ICTY in November 2017, but repeated the claim that Srebrenica was not genocide. Menachem Rosensaft, who had already clashed with Zuroff over his remarks in 2015, dismissed Zuroff's response to the  Mladić verdict, calling those who did not regard the Srebrenica massacre as genocide “wrong” from a legal point of view.
 The Norwegian war correspondent Ola Flyum released two documentaries, A Town Betrayed and Sporene etter Sarajevo ("The Remnants of Sarajevo"), in 2010 to heated  domestic debate. They were originally aired as part of the Brennpunkt docu-series by the state broadcaster NRK, although the former was condemned five months later for "violation of good press practice" by the Norwegian Press Complaints Commission, following a complaint by the Norwegian Helsinki Committee. Flyum maintained that he wanted to nuance the picture of Srebrenica by also discussing the earlier brutalities perpetrated by Naser Orić in the neighbouring villages. The documentary did not engage in outright genocide denial, yet did construe the massacre as something more spontaneous and chaotic than a planned and calculated action by the Serbs. Flyum also tried in part to shift the blame from Mladić and Karadžić to Izetbegović and Orić, implying that Srebrenica was something of a strategic sacrifice, rather than a planned ethnic cleansing. The decision not to include the ICTY's final verdicts in the documentary was vehemently criticized, in particular by Mirsad Fazlic, the Bosnian reporter of Slobodna Bosna, whom Flyum had interviewed for the film and worked with for four years.
Scholar and Israeli historian Yehuda Bauer claims that Srebrenica was an "act of mass murder, but not genocide".
Israeli historian Gideon Greif headed a  commission that issued a report in July 2021 asserting that the killing of Bosnian Muslims at and around Srebrenica in July 1995 did not constitute genocide. The report also cast the Bosniaks as aggressors before the events of Srebrenica and the Bosnian Serbs as victims prior to 1995.

Reaction to prominent figures' denialism

Menachem Z. Rosensaft publicly confronted the Simon Wiesenthal Center's chief Nazi-hunter and Director for Eastern European Affairs, Israeli Holocaust historian Dr. Efraim Zuroff, (who does not deny the killings, but who claims they did not constitute genocide) arguing that for Zuroff to be able to condemn the perpetrators and mourn victims of the genocide Jewish people suffered during the World War II, he has to condemn the perpetrators and mourn the victims of all other acts of genocide, including the genocide in Srebrenica. He also responded in writing to denialists' arguments, particularly underlining those made by Steven T. Katz, William Schabas, and the aforementioned Efraim Zuroff, in an essay titled "Ratko Mladić's Genocide Conviction, and Why it Matters", published by Tablet Magazine on the day Ratko Mladić was found guilty of "genocide, extermination, murder, and other crimes against humanity and war crimes" at the ICTY, and sentenced to life imprisonment.

To one of the denialists' arguments - number, intent, and the combination of these depending on occasion and context, Rosensaft pointed out that the ICTY's Krstić Appeals Chamber "unequivocally held that the number of victims was not a determinative factor in concluding whether or not a genocide had occurred", and affirmed the Trial Chamber's conclusion that "the Srebrenica massacre was indeed a genocide because it was an essential element of the intent to destroy the Muslim population of Eastern Bosnia as a whole". Rosensaft noted an assertion by the late Nehemiah Robinson, the Director of the Institute of Jewish Affairs of the World Jewish Congress, and a leading authority on the UN Genocide Convention, who said that the term genocide "applies even if victims constitute only part of a group either within a country or within a region or within a single community, provided the number is substantial ... it will be up to the courts to decide in each case whether the number was sufficiently large". To this, Rosenssaft added that "the courts have spoken clearly and unambiguously".

Salman Rushdie, in a Globe and Mail article, of 7 May 1999, described Handke's apologias for Serbian Milošević's government and denial of genocide, as "idiocy".
After Handke's play "Voyage by Dugout" was staged, Susan Sontag declared him "finished" in New York. Other noted reactions included Alain Finkielkraut saying that Handke became "an ideological monster", while for Slavoj Žižek Handke's "glorification of the Serbs is cynicism".

The Bosnian-American novelist and lecturer of creative writing at Princeton University, Aleksandar Hemon, joined in an international outcry, denouncing the Nobel Committee's  decision to award Handke a Nobel Prize in literature, in a piece in The New York Times for their Opinion column, published in print and online in October 15 issue, calling Handke the "Bob Dylan of (g)enocide (a)pologists", while the Berlin-based Serbian novelist, Bora Ćosić, denounced Handke:

While coming to Handke's defense, German novelist Martin Walser described the mood surrounding Handke, in relation to his opinions and attitude toward Bosnian Muslims' plight, explaining that Handke "is just being completely dismissed, in every respect morally, politically and professionally" and that all is "part of the war mood which I find a bit frightening".

See also 
Genocide denial
Historical revisionism
Historical negationism

Readings and presentations
Campbell, David Atrocity, memory, photography: imaging the concentration camps of Bosnia, two part series of detailed presentation of the case of ITN versus Living Marxism, by David Campbell, Professor of International Politics at the University of Newcastle, first published in Journal of Human Rights, March & June 2002.
SREBRENICA - Genocid u osam činova / Genocide in eight acts, SENSE News Agency, an online presentation (presentation contains material that some viewers may find disturbing)
  Srebrenica – a 'Safe haven', Netherlands Institute for War, Holocaust and Genocide Studies, an extensive Dutch government report on events in eastern Bosnia and the fall of Srebrenica.
 Leydesdorff, Selma Surviving the Bosnian Genocide: The Women of Srebrenica Speak, translation by Kay Richardson. Bloomington: Indiana University Press, 2011.
 Lehrman, Sally Missing No Longer – International commission forges ahead to identify genocide victims (Archived old portal), Scientific American,  1 September 2006 (1 August 2006)
 Cohen, Nick Decline and fall of the puppetmasters, The Guardian, 16 July 2011

References

Further reading

External links
 Yugoslavia (Former), Genocide Studies Program at Yale Uni
 Genocide-Bosnia at Peace Pledge Union Information website
 A review of the movie Storm, by director Hans-Christian Schmid (Screen Comment)

 
Genocide denial
Pseudohistory
Historical negationism
Anti-Bosniak sentiment